List of members of the Institut d'Estudis Catalans (IEC) since its conception in 1907 until May 2016.

Members of IEC

Permanent and emeritus

Correspondent members

References 

Institute for Catalan Studies
Education-related lists